The FN Browning Trombone is a pump-action long takedown rifle designed by John M. Browning in 1919, patented on 1 August 1922 and manufactured by FN Herstal from 1922 to 1974. Models manufactured post 1969 had a product code W.

The stocks of early models were susceptible to cracking, sometimes attributed to the shape of the receiver; later models, such as the dovetail scope variant, appeared to solve this problem. The pump grip of all models is susceptible to cracking, the wood between the magazine and barrel being especially thin.

External links 
 Official manual (in French)

Trombone
Pump-action rifles
Takedown guns
.22 LR rifles